In 2009, the Campeonato Brasileiro Série B, the second level of the Brazilian League, was contested by 20 clubs from May 8 to November 29, 2009. Top four teams in the table would eventually qualify to the Campeonato Brasileiro Série A to be contested in 2010, meanwhile the bottom four would be relegated to Série C next season.

Three former Brazilian champions played in this edition. Vasco da Gama was relegated for the first time in history, meanwhile Bahia and Guarani came back from Série C in 2007 and 2008, respectively. Also playing for the first time was Duque de Caxias, which was promoted along with Atlético Goianiense and Campinense. After spending a single season in Série A, Ipatinga and Portuguesa had returned to Série B along with Figueirense, which was playing top-level since 2002.

In the beginning of the tournament, Vasco was figuring in the middle of the table with 4 draws in 6 matches. Meanwhile, recently promoted Guarani had a promising start. However, another team which came from Séric C, Atlético Goianiense, managed to reach the top of the table. But when 4-time Brazilian champions woke up, no other team could stop them. Vasco took the lead in the end of the first half of the championship and never let it go. On round 34, after defeating Juventude 2−1 in a packed Maracanã Stadium, Vasco clinched their promotion. Two rounds later, in a crowded Maracanã Stadium again, the club from Rio de Janeiro reached the title after a 2−1 win against América de Natal. On round 37, Guarani and Atlético Goianiense also reached Série A along with Ceará, which did not start well but managed comeback and reach the top-four group.

In the other side of the table, teams from Northeastern Brazil struggled to avoid relegation. Campinense stayed in the bottom four group during all the championship and their relegation was confirmed on round 37. In the very same day, ABC and Fortaleza also booked their trip to Série C, meanwhile 1988 Brazilian champions Bahia avoided relegation after flirting with it in the last rounds. The last matchday decided who was the last relegated team. Brasiliense, Ipatinga and América de Natal good results sent Juventude to the third level of Brazilian football after spending 15 years in Séries A and B.

Format
For the fourth consecutive season, the tournament was played in a double round-robin system. The team with most points has been declared champions. Top four clubs ascended to Série A, meanwhile the bottom four were relegated to Série C.

Team information

Final standings

Results

Top scorers

References

2009 in Brazilian football leagues
Campeonato Brasileiro Série B seasons